Wilhelm Wagner may refer to either of:

 Wilhelm Richard Wagner (1813–1883), a German composer
 Willi Wagner (born 1941), German Olympic athlete
 Wilhelm Wagner, Ph.D. (1843–1880), a German scholar of medieval and modern Greek poetry
 Wilhelm Wagner, (1895–1977), German entomologist

See also
 Wagner (disambiguation) & (surname)